Greene Street Historic District or Green Street Historic District or variations may refer to:

 Green Street Historic District (Marion, Alabama), listed on the NRHP in Perry County, Alabama
 Greene Street Historic District (Augusta, Georgia), listed on the NRHP in Richmond County, Georgia
 Green Street District (Gainesville, Georgia), listed on the NRHP in Hall County, Georgia
 Green Street-Brenau Historic District, Gainesville, Georgia, listed on the NRHP in Hall County, Georgia
 Greene Street Historic District (Cumberland, Maryland), NRHP-listed
 Hawley-Green Street Historic District, Syracuse, New York, NRHP-listed
 North Green Street-Bouchelle Street Historic District, Morganton, North Carolina, listed on the NRHP in Burke County, North Carolina